The Wilsona School District is a school district that serves most of the rural community of Lake Los Angeles, California, United States, and its surrounding areas. It neighbors Keppel Union School District which also serves part of the community of Lake Los Angeles to the south.

The Wilsona School District has approximately 1,250 students enrolled in four schools:
 2 elementary schools
 1 junior high school
 1 alternative school

The Wilsona School District serves transitional kindergarten through the eighth grade. All high school level education (ninth to twelfth grades) in the metropolitan area is provided by the Antelope Valley Union High School District.

List of schools

Elementary Schools
Wilsona Elementary School (pre K & fifth grade)
Vista San Gabriel Elementary School (TK to fourth grade)

Wilsona Elementary School opened in 1915. It served kindergarten through eighth grade before Challenger Middle School was built in the late 1980s. Wilsona later closed, but reopened years later to serve pre K partnered with Palmdale School District and fifth grade from Challenger. As of the 2021–2022 school year (starting August 10, 2021), Wilsona Elementary School expanded to include fifth grade.

Junior High School
Challenger Middle School (sixth to eighth grade)

Challenger Middle School was built in 1987 to 1988, opening in the 1988–1989 school year. Challenger added fifth grade to its campus when Wilsona Elementary School closed. As of the 2021–2022 school year, Challenger serves sixth grade to eighth grade.

Alternate schools
Wilsona Achievement Academy (sixth to eighth grade)

Wilsona Achievement Academy served sixth grade through eighth grade as an alternative school on the south side of the Wilsona Elementary School campus. As of the 2021–2022 school year (starting August 10, 2021), Wilsona Achievement Academy remains closed and serves as the site for Wilsona's community clinic, serving the community of Lake Los Angeles and surrounding areas.

See also
List of school districts in California
Palmdale School District
Eastside Union School District
Keppel Union School District
Lancaster School District
Westside Union School District
Antelope Valley Union High School District

References

External links
 

Education in Palmdale, California
Education in Lancaster, California
School districts in Los Angeles County, California